Julia Lemigova (born 26 June 1972) is a Russian former model who was Miss USSR 1990, and is married to Martina Navratilova. She is a cast member of the Bravo reality television series The Real Housewives of Miami.

Career 
Julia Lemigova is the daughter of a Red Army colonel.

Lemigova was first runner-up at Miss USSR in 1990, elevated to be crowned Miss USSR following the disqualification of the original winner, Maria Kezha, for being underage.

As Miss USSR 1990, Lemigova represented the Soviet Union at the Miss Universe 1991 pageant, where she placed 2nd runner-up.

Lemigova moved to Western Europe after being crowned Miss USSR, eventually basing herself in Paris, where she opened her first well-being center, Joiya spa, in 2003, and launched a skincare and spa line, Russie Blanche, in 2009.

In 2021, Lemigova was announced as a cast member on season 4 of The Real Housewives of Miami, making her the third former Miss Universe finalist to join a Real Housewives franchise after Kenya Moore (Miss USA 1993, Miss Universe 1993 Top 6 Finalist) from Atlanta (seasons 5-10, 12-present) and Joyce Giraud (Miss Universe Puerto Rico 1998, Miss Universe 1998 2nd-Runner-Up) from Beverly Hills (season 4).

Private life 
In 1997, Lemigova became romantically linked to banker Édouard Stern, with whom she had a son, Maximilian, who died of shaken baby syndrome while in the care of a new nanny. Lemigova married her long-term partner Martina Navratilova in New York on 15 December 2014.

Notes

References

External links 
Russieblanche.com (archived link)

1972 births
Russian LGBT people
Living people
Miss Universe 1991 contestants
Russian beauty pageant winners
21st-century Russian businesswomen
21st-century Russian businesspeople
Soviet beauty pageant winners
Soviet female models